Kevin Wayne Mangum (born October 6, 1960) is a retired United States Army lieutenant general who last served as deputy commander and chief of staff, United States Army Training and Doctrine Command (TRADOC). He is a 1982 graduate of the United States Military Academy. He previously commanded the United States Army Aviation Center of Excellence.

References

External links

1960 births
Living people
United States Military Academy alumni
American Master Army Aviators
United States Army generals